Thomas A. Van Meter (April 22, 1943 – March 7, 1992) was a member of the Ohio General Assembly. He served in the Ohio Senate from 1973 to 1982, representing the 19th District. He also ran for the Republican nomination for governor in 1978, eventually losing to former Ohio Governor Jim Rhodes. He eventually returned to the General Assembly, serving in the Ohio House of Representatives for one term. He ran for the Republican nomination in 1982, finishing 3rd to Bud Brown.

He died of cancer in 1992.

References

1943 births
1992 deaths
Republican Party Ohio state senators
Republican Party members of the Ohio House of Representatives
People from Ashland, Ohio
20th-century American politicians